Nelson Zwinglius Graves (August 10, 1880 – March 31, 1918) was an American cricketer, active in the late 19th and early 20th centuries. Graves was one of the Philadelphian cricketers that played from the end of the 19th century through the early years of the next. He played a total of 34 first-class matches.

Graves was born in Philadelphia, the second son of Nelson Z. Graves Sr. (1849-1930), a successful paint and varnish manufacturer, and his wife Ida Johnson Graves (1850-1939).
By 1901 the Graves family were residing in an estate in Germantown at Manheim Street and Wissahickon Avenue close to the Germantown Cricket Club.

Graves began his first-class career for the Gentlemen of Philadelphia on September 14, 1894. This match was played on the Germantown Cricket Club ground against a team of Players of United States of America. Graves scored no runs in the two-day match which ended in a draw. As he was only 14 years old at the time, Graves' poor showing is hardly surprising. Four years later, Graves again played with the Philadelphians, this time against Sir Pelham Warner's touring side. This time he was one of the opening batsmen, though his performance in the loss still left something to be desired. Graves played in several other series against touring English sides while attending the University of Pennsylvania. He then joined the Philadelphian cricket team in England in 1903. It was against Lancashire on July 6 of that year that Graves reached his highest run total. In the first innings at Old Trafford, he made only 19 runs but in the second he helped the Philadelphians to their nine wicket victory with a 103 not out. This score took 105 minutes to achieve and included 9 fours. His second highest first-class score came a month earlier against Nottinghamshire with a 62 not out. His highest recorded scores came during non-first class matches. One came during a match against Scotland on the same tour. This match saw Graves reach a score of 107. In 1898 he hit 128 against Canada.

Graves continued his international career during a tour of the Marylebone Cricket Club in the United States. The side played two matches against the Philadelphians in 1905. He also joined the Philadelphian tour of England in 1908. In his last first-class match against Kent County Cricket Club on August 27, Graves only managed 7 runs in the first innings and 4 in the second.

After graduating from the University of Pennsylvania, Graves entered his father's varnish business, N. Z. Graves Inc., where at his death he was the head of purchasing and managed a factory. Graves died of meningitis in Germantown, Pennsylvania on March 31, 1918 at the age of 37.

References

External links
 

20th-century American businesspeople
Philadelphian cricketers
University of Pennsylvania alumni
Cricketers from Philadelphia
1880 births
1918 deaths
American cricketers
Neurological disease deaths in Pennsylvania
Infectious disease deaths in Pennsylvania
Deaths from meningitis